Khem Raj Bhatta Mayalu is a Nepalese politician. He is a member of the Nepali Congress (NC) party, the successor party to Nepali Congress (Democratic) [NC(D)] of which he had also been a member while it existed. (The two—formerly split—parties reunified in 2007.)  During the panchayat regime he was the general secretary of the underground leftist group Nepal Janabadi Morcha (NJM), living in exile in Lucknow, India. After the 1985 Nepal bombings, which NJM had claimed responsibility for, Mayalu received a life sentence .

In the 1994 Nepalese legislative elections Mayalu was the candidate of NJM in the Dadeldhura constituency. Mayalu came second with 9966 votes; the seat was won by Sher Bahadur Deuba of Nepali Congress with 20701 votes.

Later Mayalu joined the Nepali Congress; he won the Bardia 3 seat in the 1999 legislative elections as a Nepali Congress candidate. He got 15574 votes.

On February 23, 2001, the Maoists (at that time, the "Communist Party of Nepal (Maoist)", and since 2009, the "Communist Party of Nepal [Maoist Centre]")  attacked Mayalu's residence in Guleriya. In total Maoists have seized 15 bighas of land belonging to Mayalu.

When Sher Bahadur Deuba split away from the NC party and formed NC(D), Mayalu followed him. On October 18, 2001, Mayalu was named Minister of General Administration in Deuba's cabinet. 
 
In 2005, Mayalu participated in pro-democracy demonstrations. During a period of crack-downs on the protests, Mayalu was twice arrested, along with other protestors, on March 8 and later on May 29, 2005. It is unclear for how long he was detained.

References 

Year of birth missing (living people)
Government ministers of Nepal
Living people
Nepali Congress (Democratic) politicians
Nepali Congress politicians from Sudurpashchim Province
Nepal Janabadi Morcha politicians
Nepalese exiles
People sentenced to death in absentia
Nepal MPs 1999–2002